Tinnapob Srisathit is a professional footballer from Thailand.

External links
Profile at Thaipremierleague.co.th

Living people
Tinnapob Srisathit
1985 births
Tinnapob Srisathit
Association football forwards
Tinnapob Srisathit